Lake City is a city in Craighead County, Arkansas, United States, along the St. Francis River. Lake City is one of two county seats in Craighead County. The population was 2,326 as of the 2020 census. It is included in the Jonesboro, Arkansas Metropolitan Statistical Area.

Geography
Lake City is located in eastern Craighead County at  (35.817866, -90.439927), along the west bank of the St. Francis River.

List of highways
 Highway 18
 Highway 135
 Highway 158

Notable facts and former residents 

The St. Francis River Bridge located in Lake City is the only lift bridge in the world that has been raised only once since its construction. To construct a four-lane highway, a new bridge was constructed in 2002 and the lift bridge was moved to a location just south of the new bridge where it remains as a landmark.

Bart Barber, 64th President of the Southern Baptist Convention, was born and raised in Lake City.

Demographics

2020 census

As of the 2020 United States census, there were 2,326 people, 936 households, and 651 families residing in the city.

2000 census
As of the census of 2000, there were 1,956 people, 731 households, and 546 families residing in the town. The population density was 881.9 inhabitants per square mile (340.2/km2). The racial makeup of the town was 98.67% White, 0.05% Black or African American, 0.36% Native American, 0.05% Asian, 0.26% from other races, and 0.61% from two or more races.  1.02% of the population were Hispanic or Latino of any race.

There were 731 households, out of which 37.3% had children under the age of 18 living with them, 55.8% were married couples living together, 15.2% had a female householder with no husband present, and 25.3% were non-families. 23.0% of all households were made up of individuals, and 12.3% had someone living alone who was 65 years of age or older.  The average household size was 2.57 and the average family size was 3.00.

In the town, the population was spread out, with 27.0% under the age of 18, 8.4% from 18 to 24, 27.8% from 25 to 44, 20.7% from 45 to 64, and 16.1% who were 65 years of age or older.  The median age was 35 years. For every 100 females, there were 94.4 males.  For every 100 females age 18 and over, there were 84.4 males.

The median income for a household in the town was $30,844, and the median income for a family was $33,477. Males had a median income of $27,798 versus $19,205 for females. The per capita income for the town was $14,126.  About 11.4% of families and 14.6% of the population were below the poverty line, including 21.1% of those under age 18 and 9.1% of those age 65 or over.

Education
Lake City is part of the Riverside School District, formed as a result of consolidation with the Lake City School District with that of nearby Caraway on July 1, 1985. The Riverside High School mascot and athletic teams are known as "the Rebels". There are two elementary schools associated with the school: one is located in Lake City and the other in Caraway.

References

Gallery

 Cities in Craighead County, Arkansas
 Cities in Arkansas
 County seats in Arkansas
 Jonesboro metropolitan area